Amphiporeia virginiana is a species of amphipod in the family Bathyporeiidae.

References

Amphipoda
Articles created by Qbugbot
Crustaceans described in 1933